Snorks is an animated television series produced by Hanna-Barbera and ran for a total of four seasons (consisting of 65 episodes) on NBC from September 15, 1984, to May 13, 1989. The program continued to be available in syndication from 1987 to 1989 as part of The Funtastic World of Hanna-Barberas third season.

Origins

Early years (1977–81)
In 1977, Freddy Monnickendam, a Belgian businessman and artist, first made contact with the comics industry when he negotiated the rights for the Smurfs comics to Father Abraham. He later became the head of SEPP, a branch of Dupuis, as an editor responsible for the merchandising of the Smurfs' comic series. Then he negotiated the contract between Peyo, NBC and Hanna-Barbera for the creation of a new Smurfs cartoon series; Peyo wanted the show to be as faithful as possible to his original comics, but Monnickendam wanted it to be more mainstream and accessible. These negotiations would later result in a legal dispute between the two men due to the division of the rights and the money involved. As a final result, Monnickendam decided to compete with the Smurfs' success, starting a new series of cartoons.

Development, concept and first comic book (1981–84)
In June 1981, Nic Broca created the earlier character designs that were made for "Diskies", a very early iteration, made for the comic series Spirou et Fantasio. Soon, the debut Snorks comic book was published in January 1982 by Broca himself. Freddy Monnickendam, after battling with fellow Belgian cartoonist Peyo in court, searched for a series that could rival the success of The Smurfs, as he tried and failed to buy its rights since 1977. He acquired the Snorks' rights from Nic Broca, and both started a partnership with Hanna-Barbera for the production of this new cartoon series. After that, a three-minute Snorks pilot episode was then made for NBC, although it has not been seen by the public.

Premiere as cartoon series (1984–89)
Snorks premiered on September 15, 1984, and ended on May 13, 1989. It aired for five years. Unlike Freddy Monnickendam had hoped, he was not able to take the Snorks' success to the same heights as The Smurfs, which resulted on the end of his partnership with Broca, and finally, the disbanding of SEPP. Although the Snorks' success was limited, the cartoon show gained fans worldwide, making appearances in popular culture and gaining various product lines.

Synopsis
The Snorks are a race of small, colorful 
anthropomorphic sea creatures that live happily in the undersea world of Snorkland. They have snorkels on their heads, which are used to propel them swiftly through the water. When a Snork becomes excited, their tube makes a "snork" sound. They have much of the same technology as contemporary humans, adapted to their own aquatic environment. The Snorks use clams as currency ("clams" is also a slang term for money).

According to the Snorks backstory, which was described in the show's worldwide (first season in America) opening theme, a few ventured to the surface (which the Snorks believe is "outer space") in 1634 and watched a Royal Navyship of the Spanish Armada being attacked by pirates. The captain wound up in the water and that was the first contact between the species when the Snorks saved his life, to which the captain then expressed his gratitude by writing down the encounter in his logbook, although very few humans believe in the existence of the Snorks. Since then, Snorks have adopted several human habits, such as wearing clothes.

There are a few episodes which have human encounters with the Snorks. In the episode "Allstar's Freshwater Adventure", the Snorks (who are saltwater Snorks) meet freshwater Snorks. Freshwater Snorks have two snorkels on their head and a distinctive biochemistry from saltwater snorks.

Characters

Main Snorks
 Allstar Seaworthy (voiced by Michael Bell) an athletic, yellow-skinned Snork, generally considered to be the hero of the series. He is smart, brave and generous, usually serving as the leader of his gang during their different adventures. Allstar has a big interest, and excels, in science and inventions, much like his uncle, Dr. Galeo Seaworthy. Whenever Allstar reaches a "light bulb moment", his belt buckle would start to spin, giving him a "starbright idea". He is Casey's love interest and used to be best friends with Junior when they were younger. He has a baby sister named Smallstar. Allstar has once joked that he will never understand female Snorks in the episode "Learn to Love Your Snork" when he fails to understand why Casey is upset.
 Dimitris "Dimmy" Finster (voiced by Brian Cummings) – An athletic, orange-skinned Snork, Dimmy fancies himself to be a comedian as well as a fighter, but his attempts usually lead to awkward results. Has learned ballet from Daffney to improve his Snorkball skills. He also has a big appetite and hates being called by his full name. He is Allstar's good friend and Daffney's love interest, although he is temporarily replaced by JoJo as Daffney's date to the debutante ball and becomes jealous. Junior often calls him "Dimwit". Once had a crush on a little mermaid whom he saved from a storm and the evil Dr. Strangesnork. From the beginning of season 3, he is written out of the storylines for unknown reasons, but he does make some cameo appearances.
 Casey Kelp (voiced by B.J. Ward) – A salmon pink-skinned Snork with red hair which is tied in pigtails with two green hairbows. Usually wears a green shirt that exposes her midriff and matching pants. Smart, brave and kind-hearted. Casey will defend anyone, Snork or sea creature, when she thinks that they are either getting picked on or are in danger. She is also pretty good at drawing. She was once upset about her "giant" snork and went out of her way to hide/shrink it. She is Allstar's love interest and Daffney's best friend. However, in season 4, in the episode "Snorkerella" Casey has a big crush on a star Snorkball player named Stevie and eventually becomes his date for the school prom, making her relationship with Allstar seem nonexistent; she also appears to have a crush on Junior in the episode "The Day They Fixed Junior Wetworth" where she kissed him.
 Daffney Gillfin (voiced by Nancy Cartwright) – A pretty, coral-colored, purple-haired Snork who wears a bob hairdo and a red star-shaped hairclip. She is always concerned with her looks, but has a good heart deep down. She won the title of "Miss Junior Snorkland" in a beauty pageant with the help of Yucky, a baby rainbow swan fish (much like The Ugly Duckling). With a talent in fine arts, Daffney becomes the star of the show as the understudy for Tallulah Bankfish (a famous Broadway theatre actress from New Snork City) in a play, and has entered a piece of sculpture for an art show. She is best friends with Casey, and is Dimmy's love interest before he is written out of the show. She also has a good relationship with JoJo (who once calls Daffney "Alberta Einsnork") and Lil' Seaweed, with whom she shares fashion tips, and works as a fellow trapeze artists in a circus once.
 Wellington Wetworth, Jr. a.k.a. "Junior" (voiced by Barry Gordon) – An orange-skinned Snork with blue hair who is a headstrong snork but deep down has a good heart. He is often described as a wealthy snob that takes after his parents, especially his Governor father. During the first two seasons Junior is seen as minor villain-like, due to his rude, dishonest, snobbish attitude towards other Snorks, especially Allstar and his gang. By season 3 and 4 Bigweed and Lil Seaweed became the main villains and Junior became more genuine but his wilfulness is still there. He used to be best friends with Allstar when he was younger until standing up for himself went to his head. Junior became jealous of Allstar and his competitive side really does come into play. During the first two seasons (especially the fourth season), he appears to have a crush on Casey (in season 4, she kissed him), but starting from season 3 he is often seen with Daffney and hangs out more with Allstar's gang.
 Tooter Shelby (vocal effects provided by Frank Welker) – A green-skinned, good-natured Snork with dark green hair who is afflicted with an aphasia, due to which he can "communicate" only through "tooting" and "beeping". His parents will never share this language disorder, although his mom has a lisp. Nevertheless, he is well loved by his friends who seem to have no problem understanding him. He has the ability to communicate with some of the sea life. He has once fallen in love with another tooting Snork named Tadah.
 Corky (voiced by Rob Paulsen) – An orange-skinned Snork. He works as the Snork Patrol Officer, a dedicated defender of Snorkland and quite a workaholic. He drives a multi-functional submarine, and his home is filled with the many medals he has won for heroic achievements. He is liked by all Snorks and gets along well with Allstar and his friends.
 Occy (vocal effects provided by Frank Welker) – Allstar's pet octopus. He was once owned by Junior until the latter abandoned him. Occy did not get along well with Junior and will go out of his way to embarrass and/or chase Junior. Conversely, Occy is very loyal to Allstar. A musician, Occy has held a sold-out concert to help Allstar raise money for the heavily in-debt Dr. Galeo. He is the show's only non-Snork main character.

Supporting Snorks
 JoJo (voiced by Roger DeWitt) – A strong, fearless, tan-skinned male Snork who grew up and lives in the wild, the Snork equivalent of Tarzan. Unlike his friends in Snorkland, JoJo has two snorks, making him faster and stronger than all others, but he does not like to be taken just as a "big, brave, simple-hearted hunk". He loves freedom and mostly sea wildlife, which he is able to communicate with and tame. He is sometimes a bit uncomfortable with "civilization", which he thinks is "too much" for him. On the other hand, JoJo seems to enjoy the prehisnorkic era quite a lot and falls instantly in love with Daffnork (a prehisnorkic version of Daffney). He becomes Daffney's date to the debutante ball after saving her life. Also assists Corky in helping others from time to time.
 Fengy – A dogfish and JoJo's companion since he was a child.
 Willie Wetworth (voiced by Fredricka Weber) – An orange-skinned boy Snork, younger brother of Junior, is someone Willie looks up to although Junior is rude to him sometimes. Willie is cheerful, chatty, and well liked by the other Snorks. He is friends with Smallstar.
 Governor Wellington Wetworth (voiced by Frank Nelson in Seasons 1 and 2, Alan Oppenheimer in Season 3) – An orange-skinned male Snork with lavender colored hair. Vain and egocentric, Governor Wetworth is a stereotypical politician who generally evades blame and takes undue credit, thus disliked by the majority of Snorks. As Junior and Willie's father, he wants Junior to follow in his footsteps. Dislikes Dr. Galeo, Allstar and his gang for stealing the spotlight. He is also a younger brother to Captain Long John, a kindly old pirate who is friends with Allstar and Casey. Governor Wetworth often forgets and messes up his public speeches. Occasionally shows a good side of himself by donating to charity and encouraging Junior to earn his own money for buying a car.
 Dr. Galeo Seaworthy (voiced by Clive Revill) – A purple-skinned, bespectacled male Snork with white hair and a moustache. A scientist and inventor, he has saved Snorkland numerous times from villains and disasters with his contraptions, whose occasional kinks also serve as a running gag throughout the series. He is Allstar's uncle, brother to Dr. Strangesnork, and a friend to Allstar's gang, often providing them with various devices for their adventures. He has successfully built a time machine which helps his prehisnorkic friend Ork get back home.

Minor Snorks
 Mr. Seaworthy (voiced by Bob Holt) – A yellow-skinned male Snork. He is Allstar and Smallstar's father and manager of the Snorkland Steam Plant, responsible for providing energy for buildings and automobiles, as well as heat for heating and cooking needs for the residents of Snorktown.
 Smallstar Seaworthy (voiced by Gail Matthius) – A yellow-skinned female toddler Snork. She is Allstar's baby sister and friends with Willie. She appears to be cute, curious, friendly, but very mischievous. One time she drew on Governor Wetworth's monument and doodled on his face with Casey's red crayon.
 Mrs. Seaworthy (voiced by Edie McClurg) – A bespectacled, yellow-skinned, pink-haired female Snork, Allstar and Smallstar's mother. Owns a beautiful, expensive blue coral necklace passed down to her through many generations in her family.
 Mr. Kelp (voiced by Robert Ridgely) – A light-pink-skinned, red-haired, bespectacled male Snork and Casey's father. Owner of the Kelp's grocery store.
 Mrs. Kelp (voiced by Joan Gerber) – A light-pink-skinned female Snork and Casey's mother.
 Auntie Marina (voiced by Mitzi McCall) – A light-pink-skinned female Snork with reddish hair, Casey's aunt. Passionate about acting and theatre, and good friends with the famous actress Tallulah Bankfish.
 Mrs. Wetworth (voiced by Joan Gardner) – A female Snork with bluish hair, Junior and Willie's mother. She is usually seen correcting her husband, Governor Wetworth, during his speeches, as he tends to either forget his words or misspeak.
 Grandpa Wetworth (voiced by Frank Welker) – An orange-skinned Snork. He is Junior and Willie's grandfather and Wellington Wetworth's father. Grandpa Wetworth is a smart trickster that acts as if he knows less than what he does. He is an elderly male that is young at heart and in spirit, as well as being technologically savvy. Junior always tries to surpass him in tricks, but Grandpa Wetworth is always one step ahead. He is liked by all and likes Allstar and his friends.
 Ms. Seabottom (voiced by Edie McClurg) – A yellow-skinned, bespectacled female Snork. She is a high school teacher and appears to be the only teacher to take the students on field trips.
 Matilda (Voiced by Mitzi McCall) – An overzealous female Snork with long blond hair and a mole next to her left eye. She is seen as a cheerleader during a game and enjoys dancing a lot. She has a big crush on Junior, who tries to avoid her but never seems to succeed.
 SNIP and SNAP – A pair of robo-Snorks, with SNIP being male and SNAP female. They were created by Bigweed in order to get rid of Corky and thus take over Snorkland. They pretend to be UFOs upon first appearance. After successfully framing Corky and making him leave, they allow Bigweed and Lil' Seaweed to take over Snorkland. Then, with a change of heart and SNAP being dismantled by a furious Lil' Seaweed, SNIP helps Corky and Allstar's gang get rid of Bigweed and Lil' Seaweed. Later, Dr. Galeo manages to rebuild SNAP and create a communication device that allows SNIP and SNAP to make sounds of basic words.
 The Council of Elders (voiced by Peter Cullen and Michael Bell) – A group of four Snork Elders who are the true leaders of Snorkland and are mostly seen in the shadows. They are known to keep Governor Wellington Wetworth in check.

Villains
 Dr. Strangesnork "Seaworthy" (voiced by René Auberjonois) – A purple-skinned male Snork who has white hair adorned with black lightning-shaped streaks. He is a villainous and absent-minded mad scientist, often forgetting his own name. He attempts to take over Snorkland with various schemes and inventions. He is jealous of his brother, Dr. Galeo, and wants to take revenge upon him and his nephew, Allstar.
 Finneus (vocal effects provided by Frank Welker) – An orange catfish with black stripes. He is Dr. Strangesnork's sidekick and companion from childhood. He is always reminding Dr. Strangesnork of everything that he forgets.
 Bigweed (voiced by Michael Bell) – The main villain of the series since season 3. He is supposed to be a large, green, seaweed-like creature with magical abilities, such as disguising himself as a Snork or any other form of sea life. Seeks to take over Snorkland and enslave the Snorks, but always ends up being outwitted. His hair turns out to be an important ingredient to cure Allstar's rare disease at one point. At the end of season 4, he is friends with Allstar.Lil' Seaweed (voiced by B.J. Ward) – Bigweed's female sidekick who wears a red hair bow and makeup. Same species as Bigweed with similar magical abilities, but on a lower level. About the same age as Allstar and his friends. Later on, she is forced by Snorkland Social Services to attend school because of her age. Although Bigweed calls her "klutz", the two share a strong bond. Lil' Seaweed also forms a secret friendship with Daffney.
 Weed and Wood – Bigweed's two buddies and secondary sidekicks.
 The Great Snork Nork (voiced by Frank Welker) – An indigo-colored vampire Snork and the Snork equivalent of Count Dracula. Unlike others, his snork is on the front of his face, turning downward like an elephant's trunk and he has three fins on his head. He has fangs and sleeps like a bat, hanging upside down from the ceiling. He hates and avoids light at all cost. He has magical abilities and can hurl electrical bolts from his hands. He wants to take over Snorkland and is always accompanied by two sidekicks, who are miniature versions of him minus the magical abilities. Even though he only appears in two episodes in Season 3, he is always shown in the title sequence.
 The Snork-Eaters (various voices) – Large red creatures known to prey upon Snorks. The only thing that scares them is a type of fish called the Snork-Eater Eaters, with tiny bodies and enormous mouths. In addition, King Neptune also has the power to banish Snork-Eaters.

Others
 Serena the Mermaid – A Snork-sized miniature mermaid with long blonde hair. She is saved from a storm and later from Dr. Strangesnork by Dimmy and Casey, and is transformed into regular mermaid size by Dr. Strangesnork's enlarging machine. No longer worried about her size, she returns with her friends to the mermaid world after giving Casey one of her hair accessories and kissing Dimmy on the cheek.
 King Neptune – A character from Ancient Roman mythology serving as the ruler of the sea Poseidon. He is portrayed as a merman who controls the rise and fall of tides with a magical conch shell. Most Snorks believed King Neptune was a myth until he appears after losing his magical conch shell, which is later found by Willie. King Neptune is also shown to have the ability to banish Snork-Eaters.
 Esky – A green-colored male Snork who lives in the Snork Pole. He wears winter clothing and accessories like all the other inhabitants of his area. Although lacking in self-confidence, he is brave, responsible, and the fastest Snork in his area, having once saved his town and Allstar's gang from the Snork-Eaters with the help of a friendly Snork-Eater Eater fish.
 Ebb – A good-natured cream-colored Snork with a protruding front tooth who snorks and talks in backwards. Shunned for his eccentricities in his hometown, Ebb left and settled down in a deserted rundown reef in Snorkland. Initially mistaken by Allstar and his gang to be a faceless Snork monster, he befriends them and becomes an excellent snorkerang player. However, his new home is set to be rebuilt into a clamdominium by Governor Wetworth. Allstar's gang then plays a trick and makes the place appear haunted, and Ebb accidentally "saves" the Governor's life by chasing the "monsters" away. He is thus rewarded with a nice reef-top apartment for his "heroic deeds".
 Ork – A prehistoric Snork with long red hair, who had been frozen in an ice cube for two million years and discovered by Dr. Galeo, Daffney and JoJo. The Snork equivalent of a Stone Age caveman, Ork has bad grammar skills, dresses like Jo-Jo and is deeply homesick when trapped in the "modern" Snorkland. However, having lived in the modern days for two months, he experiences a bit of a "culture shock" when he finally returns home via Galeo's time machine. Claiming that things are no longer what he remembers them to be, Ork decides to go back to Snorkland with his new friends.
 The Snork-Eater Eaters''' – Small orange fish that can communicate with the Snorks. Their mouths can be opened and expanded to a great extent, catered specifically to devouring Snork-Eaters.

Cast
Main voices
 Michael Bell - Allstar Seaworthy, Bigweed, Council of Elders
 Nancy Cartwright - Daffney Gillfin
 Brian Cummings - Dimitris "Dimmy" Finster
 Barry Gordon - Wellington Wetworth, Jr. "Junior"
 Rob Paulsen - Corky
 B.J. Ward - Casey Kelp, Lil' Seaweed
 Frank Welker - Tooter Shelby, Occy, Grandpa Wetworth, Finneus, The Great Snork Nork

Recurring
 René Auberjonois - Dr. Strangesnork
 Peter Cullen - Council of Elders
 Roger DeWitt - JoJo
 Joan Gardner - Mrs. Wetworth
 Joan Gerber - Mrs. Kelp
 Bob Holt - Mr. Seaworthy (Seasons 1-2)
 Gail Matthius - Smallstar Seaworthy
 Mitzi McCall - Auntie Marina, Matilda
 Edie McClurg - Mrs. Seaworthy, Ms. Seabottom
 Frank Nelson - Governor Wellington Wetworth (Seasons 1-2)
 Alan Oppenheimer - Governor Wellington Wetworth (Seasons 3-4), Mr. Seaworthy (Seasons 3-4)
 Clive Revill - Dr. Galeo Seaworthy
 Robert Ridgely - Mr. Kelp
 Fredricka Weber - Willie Wetworth

Additional voices

 Patricia Alice Albrecht (Seasons 3-4)
 Jack Angel (Season 2)
 Chub Bailly (Seasons 3-4)
 Roger C. Carmel (Season 2)
 Maryann Chinn (Season 2)
 Cam Clarke (Seasons 2-4)
 Selette Cole (Season 2)
 Townsend Coleman (Season 2)
 Jim Cummings (Seasons 3-4)
 Jennifer Darling (Season 2)
 Jerry Dexter (Seasons 3-4)
 Jeff Doucette (Seasons 3-4)
 Marshall Efron (Seasons 3-4)
 Richard Erdman (Seasons 2-4)
 Laurie Faso (Seasons 3-4)
 Miriam Flynn (Season 2)
 Kathleen Freeman (Season 2)
 Pam Hayden (Season 2)
 Arte Johnson (Seasons 3-4)
 Stan Jones (Season 2)
 Zale Kessler (Seasons 2-4)
 Paul Kirby (Season 1)
 Marilyn Lightstone (Season 2)
 Shane McCabe (Season 2)
 Chuck McCann (Season 2)
 Diane Michelle (Season 2)
 Howard Morris (Season 2)
 Laurel Page (Seasons 3-4)
 Hal Rayle (Season 2)
 Peter Renaday (Season 2)
 Roger Rose (Season 2)
 Joe Ruskin (Seasons 3-4)
 Michael Rye (Season 2)
 Ken Sansom (Season 2)
 Ronnie Schell (Season 2)
 Howard Stevens (Season 2)
 Rip Taylor (Seasons 3-4)
 Jean Vander Pyl (Season 2)

Episodes

Home media
On September 25, 2012, Warner Archive released Snorks: The Complete First Season on DVD in region 1 as part of their Hanna-Barbera Classics Collection label. The release is available exclusively through Warner's online store and Amazon.com. In addition, 39 episodes have been released on Hulu per a distribution agreement with Content Media Corporation. On July 7, 2015, Warner Archive released Snorks: The Complete Second Season on DVD in region 1. On December 6, 2016, Warner Archive released Snorks: The Complete Third and Fourth Seasons''.

See also
List of works produced by Hanna-Barbera Productions
List of Hanna-Barbera characters

References

External links
 
Snorks at Don Markstein's Toonopedia. Archived from the original on July 23, 2017.

1980s American animated television series
1980s American high school television series
1984 American television series debuts
1989 American television series endings
American children's animated adventure television series
American children's animated comedy television series
American children's animated fantasy television series
Belgian children's animated adventure television series
Belgian children's animated comedy television series
Belgian children's animated fantasy television series
Comics adapted into animated series
Comics adapted into television series
English-language television shows
Fictional humanoids
NBC original programming
Star Comics titles
Television series based on Belgian comics
Television series by Hanna-Barbera
The Funtastic World of Hanna-Barbera
Underwater civilizations in fiction
Channel 4 original programming
Teen animated television series
ITV children's television shows